Club de Deportes Provincial Temuco is a Chilean football club. Its home town is Temuco, Chile.

The club was founded in 2007 and participated for 2 years in Tercera División A.

Seasons played
3 seasons in Tercera División A

See also
Chilean football league system

Temuco
Association football clubs established in 2007
2007 establishments in Chile